Rhee Sue-Goo (born 1943) is a Korean-born American biochemist. Rhee was chief of the Laboratory of Cell Signaling, National Heart, Lung, and Blood Institute, National Institutes of Health (NIH), Bethesda, Maryland. He moved to Ewha Womans University in South Korea in 2005.

Rhee received his B.S. degree in chemistry from Seoul National University and PhD degree in organic chemistry from The Catholic University of America in 1966 and 1972, respectively. He was a postdoctoral fellow of Earl Stadtman's group at NIH. He started his own lab at NIH as a section chief of signal transduction after several years of working as a senior biochemist.

His most acclaimed contribution to cell signaling is the discovery of seven of the twelve isozymes of phospholipase C. He was ranked among the most cited 250 biochemists.

References

External links
Rhee's lab webpage at Ewha Womans University, Seoul, South Korea

Living people
1943 births
South Korean emigrants to the United States
National Institutes of Health
Catholic University of America alumni
Seoul National University alumni
South Korean chemists
21st-century American biochemists
Recipients of the Ho-Am Prize in Science